Luis Raúl Jiménez Barrera (born 30 January 1987) is a Chilean former footballer who played as a central midfielder.

Career
He played for then Primera División de Chile club Cobresal. as left midfielder.

Product of Deportes Melipilla youth ranks, he was promoted to the first adult team by the coach Luis Musrri in January 2007 for play the Apertura Tournament of that year. After the relegation of his team to the Primera B and then, unfortunately to the Tercera División, three years later, Jiménez Barrera signed for Unión La Calera, team that play in the first tier of the country in that season.

In January 2012, he signed for Cobresal, club based in El Salvador at the Atacama Desert. One of the reasons of his arrival was due to Luis Musrri, coach of that club that directed him at Deportes Melipilla in 2007.

References

External links
 Luis Jiménez at Football-Lineups
 
 

1987 births
Living people
Footballers from Santiago
Chilean footballers
Chilean Primera División players
Primera B de Chile players
Tercera División de Chile players
Deportes Melipilla footballers
Unión La Calera footballers
Cobresal footballers
Lota Schwager footballers
Association football midfielders